Finland was represented by Ann-Christine, with the song "Playboy", at the 1966 Eurovision Song Contest, which took place on 5 March in Luxembourg.

Before Eurovision

National final
The Finnish national final took place on January 22 at the YLE TV Studios in Helsinki. The show was hosted by Tuula Ignatius and Risto Vanari. The winner was chosen by a professional jury in two rounds of voting. In the first round top 3 songs were chosen and in the second round the winner was chosen.

At Eurovision
On the night of the final Ann-Christine performed seventh in the running order, following Norway and preceding Portugal. It was the first Finnish entry conducted by Ossi Runne, who would conduct the Finnish Eurovision entry 22 times. At the close of voting, Finland picked up seven points and placed joint 10th with Germany and Luxembourg of the 18 entries.

Voting

Sources
Viisukuppila, Muistathan: Suomen karsinnat 1966 
Finnish national final 1966 on natfinals

1966
Countries in the Eurovision Song Contest 1966
Eurovision